Domitilla D'Amico (born 5 September 1982) is an Italian actress who specializes in dubbing, films and television.

Biography
D'Amico was born in Rome on 5 September 1982. Her father Arnaldo was a professor of electronic engineering at the University of Rome Tor Vergata, while her mother's family is half French. Her French background favors D'Amico as she often dubs characters who find themselves speaking French. D'Amico's career began in 1986 at the age of four when she acted with Ferruccio Amendola in an advertisement for a detergent. She made her debut in the dubbing industry at the age of eight when Carlo Baccarini called her to give voice to two characters from the film The Voice of the Moon, which was directed by Federico Fellini.

D'Amico is the recurring Italian voice actress for Margot Robbie, Emma Stone, Scarlett Johansson, Kirsten Dunst, Eva Green, Léa Seydoux, Raven-Symoné and Lea Michele. She has also dubbed over other well-known actresses such as Emily Blunt, Anne Hathaway, Emmy Rossum, Jena Malone, Anna Paquin, Mandy Moore, Mila Kunis and Zoe Kazan. In the film Sybil, based on a clinical case of multiple personality disorder, she voiced Tammy Blanchard as Sybil Dorsette, played in seven different ways.

Her animation work includes voicing Daphne Blake in the Scooby-Doo animated franchise and live action films, and she voiced parts in Lucky and Zorba, Neon Genesis Evangelion, Kare Kano (in which she plays the previews of the episodes live, alongside her voice actress Francesca Manicone), Chicken Little, Arthur and the Invisibles, Ratatouille, and The Princess and the Frog. She has also voiced anime characters including Haruhi Suzumiya in The Melancholy of Haruhi Suzumiya, Urumi Kanzaki in Great Teacher Onizuka, Yukari in Paradise Kiss, Noi-chan in The Wallflower, Kiki and Ursula in the 2002 Italian edition of Kiki's Delivery Service, Lettie in Howl's Moving Castle, and Kallen Kozuki in Code Geass: Lelouch of the Rebellion. Under the direction of Francesco Vairano, D'Amico voiced the character of the Fairy with Turquoise Hair as an adult, played by Marine Vacth, in the film Pinocchio (2019) directed by Matteo Garrone, both in the Italian version and in the English version.

As an actress she plays alongside Francesco Carnelutti in Non temere, a short film made in collaboration with Rai Cinema as part of the Pianeta Alzheimer project, which was aimed at raising public awareness on the conditions of Alzheimer's patients, and was screened in various cinemas on the occasion of the relative world day (21 September).

Filmography

Television

Film

Dubbing roles

Live action
 Scarlett Johansson in Just Cause, The Horse Whisperer, An American Rhapsody, He's Just Not That Into You, Iron Man 2, The Avengers, Hitchcock, Captain America: The Winter Soldier, Avengers: Age of Ultron, Captain America: Civil War, Ghost in the Shell, Rough Night, Thor: Ragnarok, Avengers: Infinity War, Captain Marvel, Avengers: Endgame, Marriage Story, Jojo Rabbit, Isle of Dogs, Black Widow 
 Kirsten Dunst in Little Women, Spider-Man, Spider-Man 2, Wimbledon, Elizabethtown, Marie Antoinette, Spider-Man 3, How to Lose Friends & Alienate People, All Good Things, Melancholia, Bachelorette, On the Road, Upside Down, Anchorman 2: The Legend Continues, The Two Faces of January, Midnight Special , Hidden Figures, The Beguile, On Becoming a God in Central Florida, Fargo
 Margot Robbie in The Wolf of Wall Street, Focus, Suite Française, Z for Zachariah, The Legend of Tarzan, Whiskey Tango Foxtrot, Suicide Squad, Goodbye Christopher Robin, I, Tonya, Terminal, Mary Queen of Scots, Once Upon a Time in Hollywood, Birds of Prey, Bombshell, The Suicide Squad
 Emma Stone in Ghosts of Girlfriends Past, Easy A, Crazy, Stupid, Love, Friends with Benefits, The Help, Gangster Squad, Movie 43, Magic in the Moonlight, Irrational Man, La La Land, The Favourite, Maniac, Cruella
 Eva Green in The Dreamers, Perfect Sense, Dark Shadows, White Bird in a Blizzard, 300: Rise of an Empire, Miss Peregrine's Home for Peculiar Children, Based on a True Story, Penny Dreadful
 Léa Seydoux in Mission: Impossible – Ghost Protocol, Sister, Blue Is the Warmest Colour, La Belle et la Bête, The Grand Budapest Hotel, The Lobster, It's Only the End of the World, The French Dispatch
 Jena Malone in For Love of the Game, The Dangerous Lives of Altar Boys, The Ruins, The Messengers, The Hunger Games: Catching Fire, The Hunger Games: Mockingjay – Part 1, The Hunger Games: Mockingjay – Part 2
 Emily Blunt in The Jane Austen Book Club, The Wolfman, Gulliver's Travels, Salmon Fishing in the Yemen, Arthur Newman, Into the Woods, Mary Poppins Returns
 Anne Hathaway in The Dark Knight Rises, Interstellar, Song One, The Intern, Ocean's 8, Serenity, Dark Waters, Locked Down
 Mandy Moore in A Walk to Remember, Chasing Liberty, Saved!, Romance & Cigarettes, American Dreamz, Because I Said So, Midway
 Zoe Kazan in In the Valley of Elah, Revolutionary Road, Ruby Sparks, It's Complicated, The Big Sick
 Amber Heard in Never Back Down, The Rum Diary, Machete Kills, 3 Days to Kill, Magic Mike XXL, The Danish Girl
 Alice Eve in Crossing Over, ATL, The Raven, Cold Comes the Night, Star Trek Into Darkness, Misconduct 
 Mena Suvari in American Beauty, Sugar & Spice, Sonny, Rumor Has It, Factory Girl, Trauma, Domino
 Anna Paquin in A Walk on the Moon, Finding Forrester, 25th Hour, Buffalo Soldiers, Margaret 
Emmy Rossum in Law & Order: Special Victims Unit, Shameless, Beautiful Creatures, A Futile and Stupid Gesture 
Amanda Seyfried in Nine Lives, Law & Order: Special Victims Unit, House, Justice, Twin Peaks, Mank, You Should Have Left 
 Mila Kunis in The Book of Eli, Black Swan, Bad Moms 2, The Angriest Man in Brooklyn, The Spy Who Dumped Me
 Natalia Tena in About a Boy, Harry Potter and the Order of the Phoenix, Harry Potter and the Half-Blood Prince, Harry Potter and the Deathly Hallows – Part 1
 Rita Ora in Fifty Shades of Grey, Southpaw, Fifty Shades of Black, Fifty Shades Freed 
 Katie Cassidy in Click, Taken, A Nightmare on Elm Street, Monte Carlo, Kill for Me
 Zoe Saldana in Crossroads, Avatar, Colombiana, The Words 
 Florence Pugh in Lady Macbeth, Fighting with My Family, Midsommar
 Carey Mulligan in An Education, Shame, Wildlife, Inside Llewyn Davis, Promising Young Woman
 Keira Knightley in Love Actually, Never Let Me Go, Collateral Beauty
Marine Vacth in Pinocchio (Italian version and English version)

Animation
 Daphne Blake in What's New, Scooby-Doo?, Shaggy & Scooby-Doo Get a Clue!, Scooby-Doo! Mystery Incorporated, Be Cool, Scooby-Doo!, Scooby-Doo and Guess Who?, Scooby-Doo! Pirates Ahoy!, Chill Out, Scooby-Doo!, Scooby-Doo! and the Goblin King, Scooby-Doo! and the Samurai Sword, Scooby-Doo! Abracadabra-Doo, Scooby-Doo! Camp Scare, Scooby-Doo! Legend of the Phantosaur, Scooby-Doo! Music of the Vampire, Big Top Scooby-Doo!, Scooby-Doo! Mask of the Blue Falcon, Scooby-Doo! Stage Fright, Scooby-Doo! WrestleMania Mystery, Scooby-Doo! Frankencreepy, Scooby-Doo! Moon Monster Madness, Scooby-Doo! and Kiss: Rock and Roll Mystery, Scooby-Doo! and WWE: Curse of the Speed Demon, Scooby-Doo! Shaggy's Showdown, Scooby-Doo! & Batman: The Brave and the Bold, Scooby-Doo! and the Gourmet Ghost, Scooby-Doo! and the Curse of the 13th Ghost, Scooby-Doo! Return to Zombie Island, Scoob!, Lego Scooby-Doo! Haunted Hollywood, Lego Scooby-Doo! Blowout Beach Bash, Lego Scooby-Doo! Knight Time Terror, Scooby-Doo! Spooky Games, Scooby-Doo! Haunted Holidays, Scooby-Doo! and the Spooky Scarecrow, Scooby-Doo! Mecha Mutt Menace, Scooby-Doo! Ghastly Goals, Scooby-Doo! and the Beach Beastie, Scooby-Doo! Adventures: The Mystery Map, Batman: The Brave and the Bold, Scoobynatural, Teen Titans Go!
 Tecna, Piff, Glim, and Livy in Winx Club
 Tecna in Winx Club: The Secret of the Lost Kingdom
 Tecna in Winx Club 3D: Magical Adventure
 Haruhi Suzumiya in The Melancholy of Haruhi Suzumiya
 Numbuh 86 in Codename: Kids Next Door
 Alexis in Transformers: Armada
 Alexis in Transformers: Energon
 Yukari "Caroline" Hayasaka in Paradise Kiss
 Luanne Platter in King of the Hill
 Azula in Avatar: The Last Airbender
 Korra in The Legend of Korra
 Veronica in The Fairly OddParents
 Mary Jane Watson in The Spectacular Spider-Man
 Kiki in Kiki's Delivery Service
 Bonnie Rockwaller in Kim Possible
 Foxy Loxy in Chicken Little (2005 film)
 Ashley Spinelli in Recess
 Ashley Spinelli in Recess: School's Out
 Ashley Spinelli in Recess: Taking the Fifth Grade
 Ashley Spinelli in  Recess: All Growed Down
 Petunia Rhubarb in VeggieTales
 Holly DeCarlo in Frosty Returns
 Scot and Dot in Between the Lions
 Zowie Polie in Rolie Polie Olie
 Julia in Tomodachi Life: The TV Series
 Elsie the Cat in Stanley
 Maya Santos in Maya & Miguel
 Dot and Lucretia in Harvey Girls Forever!
 Sister Bear in The Berenstain Bears
 Uma in Oobi
 Vega in My Life as a Teenage Robot
 Sara in American Dragon: Jake Long
 Tiana (speaking voice) in The Princess and the Frog
 Colette Tatou in Ratatouille
 Angel (speaking voice) in Lady and the Tramp II: Scamp's Adventure
 Lor McQuarrie in The Weekenders
 Sarah Lee Jones in Sarah Lee Jones (since 2002)
 Kallen Stadtfeld in Code Geass: Lelouch of the Rebellion and Code Geass: Lelouch of the Rebellion R2
 Reira Serizawa in Nana
 Sakura Kinomoto in Cardcaptor Sakura: The Movie
 Mikan Yamamura in UFO Baby
 Mitsune "Kitsune" Konno in Love Hina
 Kano Miyazawa in Kare Kano
 Sailor Moon and Sailor Jupiter in Sailor Moon (Viz Media redub)
 Jena Wakeman in My Life as an Adult Android
 Kazuho Amatatsu in Nabari no Ou
 Cinnamon in Blue's Clues
 Rouge the Bat in Sonic X
 Gloria in Happy Feet
 Sam Sparks in Cloudy with a Chance of Meatballs
 Sam Sparks in Cloudy with a Chance of Meatballs 2
 Miggery "Mig" Sow in The Tale of Despereaux
 Debbie Hyman in American Dad!
 Libby Folfax in Jimmy Neutron: Boy Genius
 Zoey in Total Drama
 Terry Bouffant in ChalkZone

References

External links
 
 

1982 births
Living people
Actresses from Rome
Italian child actresses
Italian film actresses
Italian people of French descent
Italian television actresses
Italian voice actresses